Bryan Todd (5 April 1938 – 9 June 2018) was an English professional rugby league footballer who played in the 1960s.

Background
Bryan Todd later emigrated to Australia.

Playing career

Championship final appearances
Bryan Todd played in Halifax's 15–7 victory over St. Helens in the 1964–65 Championship Final during the 1964–65 season at Station Road, Swinton on Saturday 22 May 1965.

Honours
Halifax
Rugby Football League: 1964–65

References

External links
Search for "Todd" at rugbyleagueproject.org

1938 births
2018 deaths
Bradford Bulls players
English emigrants to Australia
English rugby league players
Halifax R.L.F.C. players
Keighley Cougars players
Place of birth missing
Rugby league centres
St Helens R.F.C. players
York Wasps players
Yorkshire rugby league team players